The 2016 Australian Superkart season is a national level Superkart in Australia. There are three classes, 250cc International, 250cc National and 150cc National.

Teams and drivers

Race calendar
The championship is being contested over three rounds with three heats and a final at each round.

Championship Standings

References

Superkart
Australian Superkart Championship